99 West on South Temple (99 West) is a residential condominium tower in the City Creek development in Downtown Salt Lake City, Utah, United States, that was originally or formerly known as Promontory on South Temple, Promontory Tower, and The Promontory, and Tower One. Construction was completed before the official grand opening of the City Creek shopping center. The tower contains 185 individually-owned residential units.

History
99 West was the eventual name given to the 30 story skyscraper but the residential tower was never actually given an official name. The residential skyscraper was planned with the City Creek Center however, 99 West was only going to be constructed when the majority of units had sold in other planned residential blocks. The skyscraper was one of the later buildings to be completed as a result, despite that it was completed before the grand opening of the center.

Design
Located in the City Creek Center, 99 West is the tallest skyscraper in the redevelopment making it an icon in Salt Lake City. Just like The Regent, there is direct access to the center as well as its underground parking lot.

See also
 City Creek Center
 The Regent (City Creek)
 Richard Court (building)

References

External links

 Building Website

Residential skyscrapers in Salt Lake City
Residential condominiums in the United States
Residential buildings completed in 2011